James William Massie (11 November 1799 – 8 May 1869) was a Scottish nondenominational minister and missionary to India.

Life
Born in Glasgow, Scotland, he was ordained in 1822 and began his ministry as a missionary with the London Missionary Society in India (Madras from 1823 to 1825, and Bangalore from 1825 until around 1827). From 1828 until 1830 he tried to establish a Congregational chapel in Dunfermline, Scotland.

Massie ministered in Dublin from 1831 until 1836, and was then minister of Perth Congregational Church in Scotland until 1841. He was in Salford, England, until 1848, and then moved to London to become secretary of the Home Missionary Society.

Massie was frequently in Ireland, on revival work, and died in Kingstown, near Dublin. He was an advocate of free trade, making a celebrated speech for the anti-Cornlaw League in 1842. He was also an abolitionist, and a member of the union and emancipation societies that were formed during the American Civil War in America. He visited America several times. He was married with one son, Milton, and two daughters.

Publications
 Liberty of Conscience Illustrated
 The Contract: War and Christianity

References

Attribution
 

1799 births
1869 deaths
Scottish Congregationalist ministers